The Universitas Negeri Semarang (abbreviated UNNES ) is a public university in the city of Semarang, Central Java, Indonesia. The university is located in Gunungpati, a highland area of Semarang City, Central Java.  UNNES has eight faculties: Education, Language and Arts, Social Sciences, Mathematics and Science, Engineering, Sport Science, Economics, and Law.

History
Semarang State University (formerly known as Teachers' Training College) was established in 1965 in Semarang, the old town which is the provincial capital of Central Java. With six colleges and one graduate program, UNNES educates around 21,000 students who are scattered in the levels of Diploma, Bachelor, and Post-Graduate.

Semarang State University started with the establishment of institutions of teacher education over the SMTA. 

Course BI and Course B-II Middelbaar Onderwijzer A Cursus (MO-A) and Middelbaar Onderwijzer B Cursus (MO-B) is an educational institution set up by the Dutch colonial government that aims to prepare teacher's SMTP and SMTA. Course MO MO-A and-B was held in Semarang until 1950. MO Course be Course BI-A and MO-B Course Course B-II made that held until 1960.

The Faculty of Teacher Training and Education (Guidance and Counseling) and High School Sports (STO), BI Course and Course B-II, were integrated into the University of Diponegoro on January 1, 1961, to become the Faculty of Teacher Training and Education (Guidance and Counseling). In 1963, the Department of Physical Education which was originally part of the Course B-II was split into the High School Sports (STO), which stands alone under the Ministry of Sports. 

There is the Teacher and the Science Education Institute (IKIP), Yogyakarta, Semarang branch IKIP IKIP Semarang Semarang.

Extension Course and IKIP Tegal, Semarang branch were founded in several places, both inside and outside the city of Semarang, to meet the aspirations of primary teachers, SMTP, and SMTA who want to continue studies teacher at the Teachers' Training College Semarang.

Integration of educational institutions and the Cultural Construction Updates (LP3K) and Tinggo School Sports (STO) was established by the Ministry of Education and Culture with the aim to relevance formal education in the villages.

Logo
Three petals of Lotus flower in red and white symbolize UNNES spirit in innovating to develop international university based on Pancasila, Indonesian Constitution, and Three Pillars of Higher Education.
Wings in golden yellow with eight pieces of feather symbolize the dynamic of the university based on eight values of characters conservation: inspiration, humane, compassion, innovation, creative, sportive, honesty, and justice.
The silhouette of Tugu Muda Monument in between the wings symbolizes the spirit of struggle and UNNES identity related to its location: Semarang. The symbol shows that UNNES will grow and develop locally, nationally, and internationally without leaving out its social context.
UNNES and Universitas Negeri Semarang are written in blue symbolize the grandeur of UNNES as a house of science which develops civilization to bring out goodness to the world.

Notable people 
 Abdul Fikri Faqih (Indonesian Politician)
 Budiyanto (Kepala Kesatuan Bangsa, Politik, dan Perlindungan Masyarakat, Provinsi Jawa Tengah)
 Hery Abduh Sasmito (Hakim Pengadilan Tata Usaha Negara Samarinda)
 Prof. DR. Cahyo Yusuf, M.Pd. (Rektor Universitas Tidar Magelang)
 Prie GS (Indonesian Public Speaker, Humanist)

References

External links

  
  Official blog for staff and students

Buildings and structures in Semarang
Universities in Central Java
Indonesian state universities